Venus Williams was the defending champion, and she won in the final 2–6, 6–2, 6–3 against Polona Hercog.

Seeds

Draw

Finals

Top half

Bottom half

External links
WTA tournament draws

Abierto Mexicano Telcel - Women's Singles
2010 Abierto Mexicano Telcel